is a passenger railway station  located in the city of   Nishinomiya Hyōgo Prefecture, Japan. It is operated by the private transportation company Hanshin Electric Railway.

Lines

Layout
The station consists of a single ground-level side platform serving one bi-directional track. The station has no station building and is unattended.

Adjacent stations

History
Suzaki Station opened on the Hanshin Mukogawa Line on 21 November 1943 with the opening of the Mukogawa Line. It was out of operation from 5 January 1946 to 10 October 1948.

Passenger statistics
In fiscal 2019, the station was used by an average of 970 passengers daily

Surrounding area
The station is located in a residential area.

See also
List of railway stations in Japan

References

External links

  

Railway stations in Japan opened in 1943
Railway stations in Hyōgo Prefecture
Nishinomiya